Krishna-Rukku is a 2016 Indian Kannada-language romance film written and directed by Anil Kumar and produced by Uday K. Mehta. It stars Ajay Rao and Amulya in the lead roles. The film's music is composed by Sridhar V. Sambhram and cinematography is by Jagadish Wali.

The official launch of the film commenced in August 2015 in Bangalore. The film is a remake of 2013 Telugu movie Uyyala Jampala.

Cast
 Ajay Rao as Krishna
 Amulya as Rukku
 Girija Lokesh
 Shobhraj
 Lakshmi Siddaiah
 Swapna Raj
 Lekha Chandra
 Sidhaartha Maadhyamika

Production
The production is headed by Uday K. Mehta known for his passion for films. He has been producing quality films & the skill of marketing his films have been very much appeased by the trade people & has also been successful in his ventures.

Development
"Krishna-Rukku", the film went on floors with producer Uday K. Mehta roping in actor Ajay Rao for the lead role. After a brief speculation of whether roping Amulya or Radhika for the female lead role, the producer opted for Amulya making a fresh lead pair. A brief photo shoot involving the lead pair and other supporting character artistes was held in Bangalore. Director Anil Kumar of Dilwala fame was chosen to direct the film. Major portions of the shoot got completed in the span of 50 days with song being filmed in Bangkok.

Soundtrack
Sridhar V. Sambhram has composed the score and original soundtrack for the film. A song by the name "Lipstick Olagina" is recorded in the voice of actor Puneeth Rajkumar which is penned by Ananda Priya.

Track listing

References

External links
 

2016 films
Indian romantic comedy films
2010s Kannada-language films
2016 romantic comedy films
Films shot in Bangkok
Kannada remakes of Telugu films